Barry Fraser (February 10, 1940 – December 4, 2022) was a Canadian ice hockey executive who was the Director of Scouting for the Edmonton Oilers of the National Hockey League from 1979 to 2000.

Career
Born in Kirkland Lake, Ontario, Fraser attempted a professional hockey career as a player, but his career was cut short, due to knee injuries. He decided to pursue his dreams of being in the National Hockey League as a scout.

Fraser was credited with building the foundation which led to the Oilers' dynasty of 1983–1990. He was present when drafting big name players, such as Grant Fuhr, Kevin Lowe, Mark Messier, Glenn Anderson, Paul Coffey, and many more, as well as when the Oilers purchased Wayne Gretzky from the Indianapolis Racers. In 1983, the Edmonton Oilers went to the Stanley Cup for the first time.  They did not win, but proved Fraser a legitimate drafting scout. His name is on the Stanley Cup 5 times with Edmonton in 1984, 1985, 1987, 1988, 1990.

Personal life and death
After retiring, he resided in Cabo San Lucas, Mexico. He died in Edmonton, Alberta on December 4, 2022, at the age of 82.

References

External links
Barry Fraser's staff ptofile at Eliteprospects.com

1940 births
2022 deaths
Edmonton Oilers scouts
Ice hockey people from Ontario
National Hockey League executives
Stanley Cup champions
Sportspeople from Kirkland Lake
People from Cabo San Lucas